The Arnold–Givental conjecture, named after Vladimir Arnold and Alexander Givental, is a statement on Lagrangian submanifolds.

Statement

Let  be a compact -dimensional symplectic manifold. An anti-symplectic involution is a diffeomorphism  such that .

Status

The Arnold–Givental conjecture has been proved for certain special cases.

Givental proved it for the case when  (see ).

Yong-Geun Oh proved it for real forms of compact Hermitian spaces with suitable assumptions on the Maslov indices (see ).

Lazzarini proved it for negative monotone case under suitable assumptions on the minimal Maslov number.

Kenji Fukaya, Yong-Geun Oh, Ohta, and Ono proved for the case when  is semi-positive (see ).

Frauenfelder proved it for the situation when  is a certain symplectic reduction, using gauged Floer theory (see ).

See also
 Arnold conjecture

References

.
.

Symplectic topology
Hamiltonian mechanics
Conjectures
Unsolved problems in mathematics